Regina Ziegler (born  8 March 1944) is a German film and television producer.

Life and career 
Born in Quedlinburg, the daughter of a journalist, Ziegler briefly studied law at the Free University of Berlin, before dropping her studies to work at the Sender Freies Berlin  as a production assistant. Germany's first female film producer, she started her own independent company Ziegler Films in 1973. She produced about 500 works between cinema and television, including the Golden Lion winner film A Year of the Quiet Sun by Krzysztof Zanussi, as well as works by Volker Schlöndorff,  Andrzej Wajda, Ulrich Schamoni and her life-partner Wolf Gremm. 

During her career Ziegler received verious awards and honours, including a Romy Award for her career, a Lifetime ,  and the Federal Cross of Merit 1st Class. She served as a juror at the 44th Venice International Film Festival. In 2006, her career was the subject of a retrospective at the Museum of Modern Art in New York.

References

External links

 

1944 births
Living people
People from Quedlinburg
German film producers
German television producers
Grand Crosses 1st class of the Order of Merit of the Federal Republic of Germany